The Hôtel de Bourbon-Condé is a hôtel particulier, a kind of large townhouse of France, at 12 rue Monsieur, 7th arrondissement of Paris. It was built for Louise Adélaïde de Bourbon by architect Alexandre-Théodore Brongniart.

History
In 1780 the twenty-three-year-old unmarried daughter of the Prince of Condé, Louise Adélaïde, also known as Mademoiselle de Condé, requested permission to leave the convent of Panthémont, where she had been educated, to live in the world. To suit her station in life a generous site was purchased in the rue Monsieur on the Left Bank, where Brogniart erected a splendid house. Previously, while working for the marquis de Montesquiou in 1778, Brongniart had received permission to open the rue Monsieur, where he also built stables for the Count of Provence, and a hôtel for the Archives de l'ordre Saint-Lazare. The house was situated behind an enclosed court, entered through a central carriage passage, and faced a garden into which the central oval salon projected.

By 1782 the menuisier (chair-maker) Georges Jacob had delivered seat furnishings to the amount of 13,958 livres and Jean-François Leleu, a prominent ébéniste (cabinetmaker), had rendered a bill for veneered case-pieces,  but no detailed contemporary description of the interiors survives: Horace Walpole mentioned this "Hôtel de Condé" in passing as an exemplar of the latest French neoclassical taste, after he had his first view of the Prince of Wales's Carlton House, London, in September 1785.

The garden was landscaped in the genre pittoresque, the informal "picturesque genre" that was one aspect of French Anglomania in the 1780s. From the Boulevard des Invalides, passing along the garden, an open iron fence gave passers-by a view of the principal facade, the garden front in its landscaped setting.

In the forecourt, long stucco panels in low-relief of children engaged in Bacchanalian procession were supplied by Clodion (Claude Michel). The art historian Michael Levey has written that "the superb stucco decorations for the courtyard of the Hôtel de Bourbon-Condé ... [are] wonderfully zestful and redolent of the Renaissance in [their] unforced, enchanted pagan air, bringing hints of the countryside of antiquity into late eighteenth-century urban Paris." The reliefs were eventually removed from the walls of the courtyard and have been conserved at the Metropolitan Museum of Art since 1959.

Considerations of rank prevented the princesse de Condé from marriage, and in 1789 she escaped the first stages of the French Revolution; in 1802, in Poland she took the veil, and returned to Paris in 1816, to consecrate the rest of her life to religious work. She died in 1824, but she never again resided in Brogniart's Hôtel de Condé.

See also
 Hôtel de Condé

Notes

Sources
 Bauchal, Charles (1887). Nouveau dictionnaire biographique et critique des architectes français . Paris: André, Daly Fils. View at Google Books
 Braham, Allan (1980). The architecture of the French enlightenment, pp. 210–219. Berkeley, California: University of California Press. . Limited view at Google Books.
 Cunningham, Peter, ed. (1906). The letters of Horace Walpole: fourth earl of Orford, vol. 9, p. 14. Edinburgh: John Grant. View at Google Books.
 Levey, Michael (1995). Painting and Sculpture in France 1700-1789. New Haven, Connecticut: Yale University Press. . Limited view at Google Books.
 Parker, James (1967). "Clodion's Bas-Reliefs from the Hôtel de Condé" in The Metropolitan Museum of Art Bulletin New Series, 25.6 (February 1967): 230–241. , originally available at metmuseum.org.

External links

 Photographs of the building exterior, interior and grounds: HP Bourbon-Condé, Paris VIIème - Blog de riesener - Club Doctissimo.
 Facade of 12 rue Monsieur: street view at Google Maps.
 "Le décor de la cour de l'hôtel de Bourbon-Condé par Clodion (1738-1814)" at insecula.com.  [Photos no longer available.]

Residential buildings completed in 1782
Buildings and structures in the 7th arrondissement of Paris
Bourbon-Condé
1782 establishments in France
18th-century architecture in France